is a passenger railway station in the city of Kasama, Ibaraki, Japan, operated by East Japan Railway Company (JR East).

Lines
Inada Station is served by the Mito Line, and is located 40.1 km from the official starting point of the line at Oyama Station.

Station layout
The station consists of two side platforms serving two tracks. The platforms are connected by a footbridge. The former wooden station building was rebuilt between October 2012 and spring 2013. The station is staffed.

Platforms

History
The station opened on 8 May 1898. The station was absorbed into the JR East network upon the privatization of the Japanese National Railways (JNR) on 1 April 1987.

Passenger statistics
In fiscal 2019, the station was used by an average of 147 passengers daily (boarding passengers only).

The passenger figures for previous years are as shown below.

Surrounding area

See also
 List of railway stations in Japan

References

External links

 Inada Station information (JR East) 

Railway stations in Japan opened in 1898
Railway stations in Ibaraki Prefecture
Mito Line
Railway stations in Japan opened in 1889
Kasama, Ibaraki